Highland Oaxaca Chontal, or Chontal de la Sierra de Oaxaca, is one of the Chontal languages of Oaxaca, Mexico. It is sometimes called Tequistlatec, but is not the same as Tequistlatec proper, which is extinct.

Background 
Highland Oaxaca Chontal (or Chontal de la Sierra de Oaxaca) is one of three Tequistlatecan languages family groups. The other two are Huamelultec (Lowland Oaxaca Chontal) and Tequistlatec (extinct). They are spoken or once spoken by the Chontal people of Oaxaca State, Mexico. Tequistlatecan language is also referred to as the Chontal of Oaxaca. The distinct breakdown in the dialect of the Chontal of Oaxaca is as follows: Highland Chontal (the mountainous terrain) and Lowland Chontal (of Pacific coast). The best way to hear and remember Highland Chontal is through the beautiful myths that the native speakers share, a method used by the locals to converse the language. 

It was spoken by 4,400 people in 2010.

Phonology

Consonants 
Highland Chontal has a medium-sized inventory of 23 native consonants, along with four borrowed consonants from Spanish /β ð ɾ r/. It distinguishes ejective consonants, including the cross-linguistically unusual ejective labiodental fricative /f'/.

Turner (1966) transcribes the ejective lateral affricate [] as an ejective fricative //. It is not clear whether the ejective labiodental fricative // might likewise be a phonetic affricate [p̪fʼ] or similar.

The placeless voiceless nasal /ɴ̥/ assimilates to the place of articulation of the consonant following it, e.g. /ɴ̥t/ > [n̥t]. Thus it has four allophones [m̥ n̥ ɲ̊ ŋ̊]. Its place of articulation before glottal consonants, vowels or pause is unclear, if it occurs in these environments at all.

Vowels 
Highland Chontal has an inventory of five vowels, an arrangement similar to Spanish and many other world languages:

The distinction between /e/ and /a/ is neutralized before /j/.

There is no vowel hiatus (since all syllables begin with a consonant), nor any phonemic diphthongs.

In the Highland Chontal also has stressed vowels which are  /í é á ó ú/.

Orthography 
In Highland Chontal, phonemes correspond to orthographic conventions which are in angled brackets <>.

Syntax 
The structure for highland Chontal is formatted but, not limited to: Verb-Subject-Object or VSO, another order is SVO. Rules for prefixes depend on the tense used,

Example: in the first-person plural for an object, if it is present in a sentence, it does not allow subject prefix. The order for certain words like adjectives and nouns can change, the examples below can be used for reference:

Suffixes 
Identifying a singular person object in a sentence is marked by a suffix, plural objects in sentences are always suffixes.

Morphemes 
The morpheme in the sentence structure determines which roots are used by verb stems. Readers can identify nouns in sentences by "limiters", these are described as prefixes. Limiters can be in a sentence structures as initial words and also be present if possession prefixes are present.

The Highland Chontal of Tequistlatecan has a complex system of verbal prefix system. According to Gregory Richter, the author of "Highland Chontal Morphology: Some New Perspectives", the current morphological structure for Highland Chontal is that there are distinct verb classes and they each have a set of corresponding prefixes. Highland Chontal can be differentiated from Lowland with its tense and subject prefixes, the sets of rules for prefixes in highland is not found with lowland chontal.
 

Morphological structure: VERB--> (NPST-) (PREFIX-) ROOT (-SUFFIX)

The tables above show the one to one correspondence between segments of a prefix and its underlying representation.

The table shows the changes in the paradigm of /inu/ (run) when appended to the particle /l/ (when).with yes/no are used by rising the pitch of speech in speaking. Examples:

Particles 
Highland Chontal contains three main interrogative particles for inquiring more information, the particles are:

be- ‘where’, nai- ‘who’, and te ‘what’

LIM:limiter
RCT:recent
IMPF:imperfective

References

External links

Highland Oaxaca Chontal basic lexicon at the Global Lexicostatistical Database

Tequistlatecan languages
Endangered indigenous languages of the Americas